Phacusa tenebrosa is a moth of the family Zygaenidae. It was described by Francis Walker in 1854. It is found in northern India.

References

Moths described in 1854
Procridinae